Frank's RedHot is a hot sauce made from a variety of cayenne peppers, produced by McCormick & Company. The Original blend ranks low on the Scoville scale, with 450 SHUs, but the XTRA Hot variety measures 2,000 SHUs.

History
The Frank Tea and Spice Company was founded in 1896 in Cincinnati, Ohio. In 1917, owner Jacob Frank contracted for the Estilette Pepper Farm in Louisiana where Adam Estilette and Frank became business partners. They mixed spices, vinegar, garlic and cayenne peppers and aged them, creating the original blend of Frank's RedHot, which entered the market in 1920. Frank's RedHot is the primary ingredient in many Buffalo wing recipes, but was probably not used in the original 1964 Anchor Bar recipe. In 1977, Frank's RedHot was sold to Durkee Famous Foods. Following the purchase of the Durkee brand in 1995, it was owned by Reckitt Benckiser until 2017. Frank's is produced in Springfield, Missouri. In 2007, Thanasi Foods began marketing licensed Frank's RedHot flavored beef jerky and meat snacks. In August 2017, spice maker McCormick & Company closed a $4.2billion deal that included French's mustard and Frank's RedHot sauce.

Advertisements
Frank's RedHot is known for its national television ad campaign depicting an irreverent elderly woman named Ethel explaining her recipes for various foods. Usually in front of a prestigious figure (e.g., the Queen), she will quip "I put that s*** on everything", much to the disdain of those around her. The expletive is always censored with a bleep, and Ethel's mouth is covered with a censoring "splat".

See also

Condiment
List of hot sauces
Scoville heat scale

References

External links
Frank's RedHot — Official Home Page
Frank's RedHot on the ChilliWorld Scoville Scale
Franks RedHot Canada

Hot sauces
Culture of Buffalo, New York
Brand name condiments
Reckitt brands
Products introduced in 1920
American brands
McCormick & Company brands